Jalachhayam is a 2010 Indian Malayalam-language experimental film, produced and directed by Sathish Kalathil under the banner of The People's Films. The story was written by Sujith Aalungal and describes the warm relationship between a village man and an artist (painter) from the city.
The film was shot entirely on a mobile phone camera, Nokia N95 Music edition (8gb internal memory with 5 megapixel resolution) mobile phone was entirely used without assistance of traditional or outside camera lenses to film.

Plot
Mohan, an art teacher at a city college, discovers the artistic talent of Sadanandan, an ordinary villager. Mohan instructs him in various modern methods of painting and buys the paintings produced by Sadanandan, which, although more proficient than that of most amateurs, were nevertheless beyond the expectations of Mohan. Sadanandan is totally unaware that Mohan is unscrupulously making use of his talent for his own benefit. Jalachhayam describes how Sadanandan survives the moment that he realises that Mohan, a revered figure to Sadanandan, is exploiting him.

Cast 
Baburaj Puthoor:  as Sadanandan
Dr. B. Jayakrishnan:  as Mohan
Prasanna Balan:  as Geetha, wife of Mohan
Prof.K.B. Unnithan: as Panicker
Chitramohan: as Tom
Baby Nimisha:  as Nimisha, daughter of Mohan
Baby Lakshmi:   as Chinju, daughter of Sadanandan
Master Navin Krishna: as Kannan, son of Sadanandan
And, Malayalam-Tamil film actress Kripa, Malayalam lyricist and poet Mullanezhi, Malayalam cine-serial actress Remadevi are given guest appearance in the film. Other leading performers are N. P. K. Krishnan as Krishnan, Das Anjery as Dasan, Rukia Kechery as Kausalya, Saju Pulikkottil as Saju, Ajeesh M Vijayan as Ajeesh.

Production
The acclaimed film director P. Ramdas (Director of Newspaper Boy) had been Switched-on the film at Namboodiri Vidyalayam School, Thrissur on 22 November 2008 and shooting completed on 6 December 2009 with post-production completed in 2010.

Jalachhayam, shot entirely on a smart phone had its theatrical premiere in Thrissur, Kerala, India on 6 June 2010 at Sree theatre and Mrs. Sindhu Lohithadas, wife of the late A. K. Lohithadas Malayalam film director, inaugurated and Prof. R. Bindu, the hon’ble mayor of Thrissur Municipal Corporation presided over the Jalachhayam review ceremony at Hotel Elite International, Thrissur. K. P. Rajendran, the hon’ble Revenue Minister of Kerala, T. K. Vasudevan, Malayalam film director, T. V. Chandramohan Ex-MLA, Prof.K.B. Unnithan, social activist, B. Asok Kumar, Asst. Engineer, All India Radio, Joy M. Mannur, President, Thrissur Press Club, V. R. Rajamohan bureau chief of Madhyamam Daily, N. P. K. Krishnan, Chairman, West Hills Travels, and over 500 film lovers attended.

Soundtrack 
The song was composed by Unnikumar, sung by Baburaj Puthur and written by Sidharthan Puranattukara.

References

External links

 
Official Website
Jalachhayam (2010)
Functions Of Jalachhayam

2010 films
2010s Malayalam-language films
Indian independent films
Indian avant-garde and experimental films
Mobile phone films
2010s avant-garde and experimental films